The three-spot nudibranch, scientific name Aldisa trimaculata, is a species of sea slug, a dorid nudibranch, a marine gastropod mollusc in the family Cadlinidae.

Distribution
This demersal species has so far only been found around the southern African coast, on both sides of the Cape Peninsula, in 10–30 m of water. It may possibly be endemic to that area.

Description
The three-spot nudibranch is a tan-coloured dorid with a warty skin and three brown spots, which are themselves spotted with lighter patches. The animal has eight gills arranged around the anus and its rhinophores are perfoliate. It may reach a total length of 40 mm.

Ecology
This species feeds on sponges.

References

Aldisa
Gastropods described in 1985